Lelei Alofa Fonoimoana (born November 4, 1958), also known by her married name Lelei Moore, is an American former swimmer who competed in the 1976 Summer Olympics in Montreal, Quebec.  She earned a silver medal as a member of the second-place U.S. team in the 4×100-meter medley relay, and also finished seventh in the 100-meter butterfly.

See also
 List of Olympic medalists in swimming (women)

References

1958 births
Living people
American female butterfly swimmers
Olympic silver medalists for the United States in swimming
Swimmers at the 1976 Summer Olympics
Medalists at the 1976 Summer Olympics
People from Sterling, Illinois
20th-century American women